Ralph Ducy (1904 – death date unknown) was an American Negro league outfielder in the 1920s.

A native of New Orleans, Louisiana, Ducy was the older brother of fellow Negro leaguer Eddie Ducy. He made his Negro leagues debut in 1924 with the St. Louis Giants, and went on to play for the Dayton Marcos in 1926.

References

External links
 and Baseball-Reference Black Baseball stats and Seamheads

Date of birth missing
Year of death missing
Place of death missing
Dayton Marcos players
St. Louis Giants players
Baseball outfielders
Baseball players from New Orleans
1904 births